This is a list of cricketers who have played first-class, List A or Twenty20 cricket for Rajasthan cricket team. Seasons given are first and last seasons; the player did not necessarily play in all the intervening seasons. Players in bold have played international cricket.

A
Arvind Apte, 1968/69-1970/71
Azeem Akhtar, 2013/14-2014/15
Pravin Amre
Pramod Arya, 1975/76-1981/82
Aditya Narendra Garhwal 2014–present

B
Asgar Baig, 1991/92-1992/93
Jitendra Bhatnagar, 1963/64-1969/70
Rajat Bhatia
Rajesh Bishnoi, 2006/07-2016/17
Rajesh Bishnoi, 2016/17
Chetan Bist
Robin Bist, 2007/08-2014/15
RAHUL Yogi,

C
Deepak Chahar, 2010/11-2016/17
Rahul Chahar, 2016/17
Raman Chahar, 2010/11-2012/13
Aakash Chopra, 2010/11-2011/12
Aniket Choudhary, 2011-2013
Kishan Choudhary, 2000/01-2009/10

D 
 Anup Dave, 1998/99-2005/06
 Kaushal Dewara, 1997/98-2004/05
 Nikhil Doru
 Salim Durani, 1956/57-1977/78

G 
 Kailash Gattani, 1962/63-1982/83
 Amitkumar Gautam
 Arjit Gupta, 2009/10-2015/16
 Naresh Gehlot, 2003/04-2013/14
 Shailender Gehlot, 2002/03-2014/15
 Subhash Gupte, 1960/61-1962/63

H 
 Divya Pratap Singh Hada, 2013/14
 Tanveer-Ul-Haq
 Nazmul Hussain, 1968/69-1979/80

I 
 Mohammad Ilyas, 1991/92

J 
 Ajay Jadeja, 2005/06-2006/07
 Anshu Jain, 1996/97-2010/11
 Deepak Jain, 1985/86-1994/95
 Rohit Jhalani, 1997/98-2011/12

K 
 Hrishikesh Kanitkar, 2010/11-2013/14
 Afroz Khan, 2003/04-2011
 S. F. Khan
 Madhur Khatri, 2009/10-2015/16
 Sumit Khatri, 2006/07-2010/11
 Gagan Khoda
 P. Krishnakumar

L 
 Ankit Lamba, 2009/10-2015/16
 Mahipal Lomror, 2016/17

M 
 Sumit Mathur, 2002/03-2012/13
 Vinod Mathur, 1971/72-1984/85
 Yogesh Mathur, 1988/89-1992/93
 Ashok Menaria, 2008/09-2016/17
MANRAJ SINGH, 2016/17

N 
 Arjun Naidu, 1957/58-1961/62
 Amar Negi, 1986/87-1988/89
 Naveen Negi, 1996/97-1997/98
 B. B. Nimbalkar, 1956/57-1957/58

O 
 Sanjee Ohlan, 1996/97

P 
 Rashmi Parida, 2010/11-2012/13
 Prakash Poddar, 1964/65-1966/67
 Vikas Purohit, 1990/91-1991/92

R 
 L. Rathore, 1983/84
 Rajiv Rathore, 1985/86-1995/96
 Kishan Rungta, 1956/57-1969/70
 Rajendrakumar Rungta, 1962/63-1965/66
 Ravi Vishnoi  Birami, jodhpur, Rajasthan

S
Vineet Saxena
Mahesh Sharma, 1973/74-1976/77
Pranay Sharma
Rohit Sharma, 2004/05-2009/10
Chandrapal Singh, 2013/14-2015/16
Devendra Pal Singh, 1993/94-2003/04
Gajendra Singh Shaktawat 1970/71-1980/81
Gajendra Singh
Hanumant Singh, 1957/58-1978/79
Kukna Ajay Singh
Manender Singh
Nathu Singh
Pankaj Singh, 2004/05-2016/17
Rituraj Singh

T 
 Ashok Tipnis, 1955/56
 Rajnikant Trivedi, 1963/64-1964/65

V 
 Dilip Verma, 1976/77
 Shubhanshu Vijay, 2005/06-2008/09
 Sanajay Vyas, 1979/80-1989/90

W 
 Mohammed Wasid, 1998/99-1999/00

Y 
 Pramod Yadav, 1996/97-2000/01
 Puneet Yadav, 2010/11-2016/17
 Vijendra Yadav, 1990/91-1997/98
 Vikrant Yadav, 2002/03-2011/12
 Vivek Yadav, 2010/11
 Dishant Yagnik, 2002/03-2015/16

Z 
 S. K. Zibbu, 1951/52-1962/63

Rajasthan cricketers

cricketers